The Paul P. Vouras Medal is an award established in 1988 and given by the American Geographical Society for "outstanding work in regional geography." The award, designed by Hilary Lambert Hopper, was established by a gift from Dr. Vouras, Emeritus Professor of Geography at William Paterson University in New Jersey.

History
Paul P. Vouras is renowned for writing regional works, such as his famous paper titled The changing economy of Northern Greece since World War II.

Recipients
The following people received the award in the year specified:

 1997: Deborah E. & Frank J. Popper
 1998: Robert C. West
 2001: John Fraser Hart
 2019: Daniel Arreola

See also

 List of geography awards

References

External links
 Official website

Awards of the American Geographical Society
Awards established in 1988